The acronym LVZ can stand for:

 Low-velocity zone, in tectonics
 Leipziger Volkszeitung, a daily newspaper in Leipzig, Germany